Polycount is a website and community of professional & hobbyist artists that specialize in creating 3D art for video games.

History 
Founded on April 1, 1998 by Andrew Risch and Ted Shockey, the site was originally named Q2PMP (Quake2 Player Model Pack), featuring user created Quake 2 plug-in characters.

Although Polycount was known mainly for Q2PMP, its first main goal was to save and show off Quake 2 player plug-in models. Despite the fact that starting at 2005, numerous FPS games have gotten incredibly confounded to make custom player model substance for, Polycount stays a fundamental network where specialists and experts the same sharpen their art. The core of Polycount is the Forum. Famously genuine in investigate, our locale of expert and specialist craftsmen have been posting, teaming up, and helping each other like no other 3D workmanship site since Polycount started in 1997. In case you're hoping to improve your range of abilities, learn new deceives or strategies, or simply have an assessment on all things video game workmanship, make certain to look at the discussion. Their main goal is to "provide 3D videogame artists the best resource for 3D news, discussion, and community. Every decision, update, and move we make internally is with our community’s best interests in mind."

Present 
Polycount is widely known for its community forum, but also features a wiki for resources for 3D artists, and a front-page news section covering contests, interviews and spotlighting resident artists. Polycount was a large part of the Mann Co. Store update for Valve's Team Fortress 2, and has since partnered with game studios such as Vigil Games, Riot Games, Valve, and Torn Banner Studios to host contests for creating video game art assets and concept art for well known games, including Darksiders II, League of Legends, Chivalry: Medieval Warfare, and Dota 2.

Polycount is also home to Greentooth, an easter egg that has been found in games such as Battlefield 3, Sunset Overdrive, The Sims 4, Hitman: Absolution, Overwatch, Overwatch 2, Satellite Reign, XCOM 2 and Deus Ex: Mankind Divided. Up till today, Polycount is still quite active with a large community behind it. As well as the release of Quake ll for RTX.

References

External links
 Polycount

Art websites